Virginia is a state in the United States of America.

Virginia most often also refers to:
West Virginia, another U.S. state.
Virginia (given name)

Virginia may also refer to:

Places

Australia
Virginia, Queensland
Virginia, South Australia

Brazil
Virgínia

Canada
Virginia, Ontario

Colombia
La Virginia

Honduras
Virginia, Lempira

Ireland
Virginia, County Cavan, a town

Liberia
Virginia, Liberia

South Africa
Virginia, Free State

United States
Virginia, California
Virginia, Idaho
Virginia, Illinois
Virginia, Minnesota
Virginia, Missouri
Virginia, Nebraska
Colony of Virginia, prior to American independence
Virginias: Virginia + West Virginia

Film
Virginia (1941 film)
Virginia (2010 film)

Literature
Virginia (play), a 1754 tragedy by Samuel Crisp
Virginia (novel), a novel by Ellen Glasgow
"Virginia" (poem), a poem by Thomas Babington Macaulay

Music
"Virginia", a song by Tori Amos from Scarlet's Walk
"Virginia", a song by Gin Blossoms from Congratulations I'm Sorry
"Virginia (Touch Me Like You Do)", a song by Bill Amesbury (now known as Barbra Amesbury) that peaked at #59 on the Billboard Hot 100 chart on April 6, 1974.

Opera
Virginia (Mercadante)
Virginia (Montero)
Virginia (operetta), a 1937 operetta by Arthur Schwartz

Ships
Virginia (pinnace), or Virginia of Sagadahoc, a pinnace built in 1607–08
Virginia (schooner), a wooden replica schooner launched in 2005
CSS Virginia, a Confederate States Navy ironclad
HMS Virginia, a 32-gun frigate
SS Brazil, a passenger steamship launched as SS Virginia
USRC Virginia (1791), a Revenue Service cutter in service from 1791–1798
USRC Virginia (1797), a Revenue Service cutter in service from 1798–1807
USS Virginia (1776), a 28-gun sailing frigate built in 1776, captured by the British and recommissioned as HMS Virginia
USS Virginia (1797), a 14-gun revenue cutter built in 1797
USS Virginia (1825), a 74-gun ship of the line laid down in 1818 but never launched
USS Virginia (1861), a captured Spanish blockade runner during the American Civil War
USS Virginia (BB-13), a Virginia-class battleship commissioned in 1906
USS Virginia (SP-274), a yacht purchased by the Navy that patrolled Lake Michigan during World War I
USS Virginia (SP-746), a motorboat acquired by the Navy that patrolled the east coast during World War I
USS Virginia (SP-1965), a two-masted auxiliary schooner acquired by the Navy that patrolled the east coast during World War I
USS Virginia (CGN-38), a Virginia-class cruiser commissioned in 1976
USS Virginia (SSN-774), a Virginia-class submarine commissioned in 2004

Other uses
Virginia (snake), a genus of snake
Virginia creeper, a plant in the grape family, Vitaceae.
Virginia (tobacco)
Virginia (video game)
Virginia (VTA), a light rail station in San Jose, California
The Virginia, an apartment building in Richmond, Virginia
University of Virginia
Virginia Cavaliers, the university's athletic teams
Virginia Agricultural Show, annual event in Ireland
Vickers Virginia, a British bomber aircraft
50 Virginia, an asteroid

See also
East Virginia (disambiguation)
Typhoon Virginia (disambiguation)
Verginia
Virginia (ship), a list of ships named "Virginia"
Virginia Park (disambiguation)
Virginia Water, a village in Surrey, England, UK
Virginia Water Lake, in the borough of Runnymede in Surrey
Virginian (disambiguation)
Virginie (disambiguation)
West Virginia (disambiguation)